Jason Blaine  (born April 19, 1980) is a Canadian country music singer/songwriter from Pembroke, Ontario. Blaine is a multiple Canadian Country Music Association (CCMA), SOCAN & Country Music Association of Ontario Award winner with over 20 Canadian country radio hits. Twelve of those went on to become Nielsen BDS Top 10 singles on the Canadian country chart including "Country Side", "Friends of Mine", and the biographical "They Don't Make 'Em Like That Anymore".

Family 
Blaine lives in the greater Nashville area with his wife, Amy, and their four children.

Career
Blaine's first hit single, “Rock In My  Boot”, was released in 2007. It led to multiple CCMA nominations and paved the way for a string of hit singles and major festival  appearances across the country. His most successful song to date was the biographical “They Don’t Make ‘Em Like  That Anymore”, which was written for his grandfather and released in 2012. The song eventually went on to win CCMA Single of the Year. Overall, Blaine has released six full-length albums. He has also been a staff songwriter in Nashville for the past decade, writing songs for other artists including Chris Janson, Parmalee, Petric and Madeline Merlo.

Discography

Albums

Singles

As a featured artist

Music videos

Awards and nominations

References

External links
Official Site

1980 births
Living people
Canadian country singer-songwriters
Canadian male singer-songwriters
People from Pembroke, Ontario
Algonquin College alumni
Musicians from Ontario
21st-century Canadian male singers